Falakro Oros (Greek: Φαλακρό όρος, translated in English as: "Bald mountain"; , Bozdag; Turkish: Bozdağ, translated in English as: "Gray mountain") is a mountain in the Drama regional unit, eastern Greek Macedonia, northern Greece. The elevation of its highest summit, Profitis Ilias, is 2232 meters above the sea level. There is a ski resort on the mountain.

А very small part of a low northern offshoot of Falakro extends into Bulgarian territory, just south of the village of Beslen in Blagoevgrad Province. The highest point that is part of Bulgaria is the forested peak Chiplakbair (1090 metres high) on the border between the two countries.

Gallery

References

External links
Greek Mountain Flora
Snow Forecast - Falakro Oros
Falakro terrain map by Geopsis

Landforms of Drama (regional unit)
Mountains of Bulgaria
Two-thousanders of Greece
Landforms of Blagoevgrad Province
Mountains of Eastern Macedonia and Thrace
International mountains of Europe
Ski areas and resorts in Greece
Rhodope mountain range